Miano is a suburb of Naples.

Miano may also refer to:

Miano (surname)
Miano (Naples Metro)

See also
Mianos, a municipality in Zaragoza, Aragon, Spain